Amanda Lucille Warner (born September 12, 1982), known professionally as MNDR, is an American singer, songwriter, and record producer. She rose to prominence after being featured on Mark Ronson & The Business Intl's 2010 single "Bang Bang Bang", which peaked at number six on the UK Singles Chart.

Life and career

1998–2006: Early life and career beginnings
Amanda Lucille Warner was born on September 12, 1982, in Fargo, North Dakota, where she was raised on a farm. Her father built a four-track reel-to-reel in the basement of the family's farmhouse, and when Warner was about nine or 10 years old, he taught her how to record on it. In 1998, when Warner transferred to Macalester College in Saint Paul, Minnesota, from Portland, Oregon, she met Brian Tester through Susan Lindell, a mutual friend, and the three formed the electronic pop band Triangle. A few months after the trio's self-titled four-track debut EP was released in 1999 on their own label, Smoke + Mirrors, Lindell left the band to join the touring musical Buddy: The Buddy Holly Story as a guitar tech.

As a duo, Triangle released a second EP titled Peek Meeter in 2000 on Smoke + Mirrors, and after signing to the Philadelphia-based label File 13 Records, they released their full-length debut album, *, on October 16, 2001. Warner graduated from Macalester College in 2001 with a minor in chemistry and a major in double bass. In 2006, Triangle released their second album, Decimal Places, through Chicago's Essay Records.

2009–2010: E.P.E. and "Bang Bang Bang"

Warner relocated from Oakland, California, to New York City in mid-2009 to work as a songwriter for hire, after a publishing company scout offered her a deal to write songs for mainstream artists. She soon met producer Peter Wade, and after months of writing with him, he suggested that she release an album under her own name. At the time, Warner designed a touring keyboard rig and played bass for the Yeah Yeah Yeahs during the making of their album It's Blitz! (2009). MNDR has since opened for bands such as Yacht, Massive Attack, Deerhoof, Miike Snow, Chromeo, The Ting Tings, and Duran Duran, and frequently collaborates with visual artist Jamie Carreiro, who provides visual effects for her live shows. Warner and Wade uploaded four tracks to Myspace in 2009, which eventually became MNDR's debut EP, E.P.E., released on April 6, 2010, on Wade's WonderSound Records. The EP was preceded by MNDR's debut single, "C.L.U.B.", released on March 24, 2009.

Warner has performed under the moniker MNDR since 2005, around the time she was performing in the Bay Area. The name was given to her by a Fargo friend, who called her "Mandar" while she was still in high school. The spelling and design were inspired by early Detroit techno, early Chicago house, and German techno. Warner explained, "MNDR is a group with Peter Wade in the sense that we make and write all of the music. However, I perform as a solo artist and all that comes with that."

After hearing some of MNDR's music, English producer Mark Ronson invited Warner on his East Village Radio show in 2010, where he played one of her songs. Ronson asked if she would like to write on his third album, Record Collection (released under the moniker Mark Ronson & The Business Intl), resulting in what would become the album's lead single, "Bang Bang Bang", which features vocals by Warner and Q-Tip. Written by Warner, Wade, Ronson, and Q-Tip, the song was released on July 9, 2010, reaching number six on the UK Singles Chart.

MNDR performed "Bang Bang Bang" with Mark Ronson & The Business Intl and Q-Tip on several television shows, including Friday Night with Jonathan Ross on July 2, 2010, Later... with Jools Holland on September 17, Late Show with David Letterman on October 11, and Jimmy Kimmel Live! on October 14. She later joined Mark Ronson & The Business Intl and toured the US, Europe, and Australia for a year, while also touring as MNDR in her free time.

2011–2013: Feed Me Diamonds
In October 2011, MNDR signed to Ultra Music. Her first single with the label, "#1 in Heaven", was released on January 17, 2012. MNDR told Spin magazine that the lyrics are inspired by kidnapped heiress Patty Hearst, commenting, "The lyrics to the chorus are her words [...] After she was arrested for robbing a bank where someone was murdered, her only press statement was, 'Tell them [my brothers and sisters] I am smiling and send my greetings.'" The accompanying music video was directed by Ssion lead singer Cody Critcheloe and takes inspiration from women such as Jane Fonda, Wendy O. Williams, and Valerie Solanas. In an interview with Coup De Main magazine in February 2012, MNDR revealed that her debut studio album was titled Feed Me Diamonds, adding that the title track is a homage to performance artist Marina Abramović.

"Faster Horses" was released on July 17, 2012, as the second single from Feed Me Diamonds. The song is inspired by the Henry Ford quote, "If I had asked people what they wanted, they would have said faster horses." The album was released on August 14, 2012, by Ultra Music, and was streamed in full on the Spin website the previous day. The title track was released on December 17, 2012, as the album's third single, and its music video stars drag queen and former RuPaul's Drag Race contestant Raven. On December 17, 2012, MNDR made a second appearance on Late Show with David Letterman, performing "Feed Me Diamonds". Feed Me Diamonds was named the eighth best pop album of 2012 by Spin.

2014–present: Hell to Be You Baby
On June 16, 2014, MNDR announced via Twitter she was working on her second studio album. Later that year, MNDR co-wrote the song "Get a Little Closer", recorded by Rita Ora for the Adidas Originals #unstoppable campaign. She collaborated with the duo Sweet Valley for a five-track EP titled Dance 4 a Dollar, released on February 24, 2015, by Fool's Gold Records. MNDR described the EP as "the altered states parallel universe of East LA neighborhoods Highland Park and Eagle Rock. It is the soundtrack to nihilist future acid punk versions of these worlds, mixed with cough syrup and taking nods from Charles Burns' Black Hole, Akira, and Love and Rockets." On October 9, 2015, she released "Kimono", a teaser single for her then-untitled second album. The song was also featured in the promotional video for season 11 of the E! reality television series Keeping Up with the Kardashians. On January 27, 2016, MNDR announced via Instagram that her second album, titled The Mainstream, was finished.

On July 7, 2016, Duran Duran announced that MNDR would stand in for founding keyboardist Nick Rhodes during part of the third leg of the Paper Gods tour in the United States. Rhodes was quoted as saying, "I will be back as soon as I can but know, in the meantime, that I am leaving both the band and fans in great hands, with the fabulous MNDR." MNDR collaborated with Scissor Sisters on the charity single "Swerlk", released on June 9, 2017, in celebration of Pride Month and in honor of the one-year anniversary of the mass shootings at the Pulse nightclub in Orlando.

On September 12, 2019, MNDR released "Save Me", the first official single from her second studio album, Hell to Be You Baby.

Discography

Studio albums

Extended plays

Singles

As lead artist

As featured artist

Guest appearances

Remixes

Production and songwriting credits

Music videos

Awards and nominations

References

External links
 

1982 births
20th-century American singers
20th-century American women singers
21st-century American singers
21st-century American women singers
American women singer-songwriters
American keyboardists
American synth-pop musicians
American women in electronic music
American women record producers
Electropop musicians
Living people
People from Fargo, North Dakota
Record producers from New York (state)
Singers from New York City
Synth-pop singers
Ultra Records artists
Mom + Pop Music artists
Singer-songwriters from New York (state)
Singer-songwriters from North Dakota